Diego de Guevara y Estrada (1612 – April 1642) was a Roman Catholic prelate who served as the Archbishop of Santo Domingo (1641–1642).

Biography
Diego de Guevara y Estrada was born in México. On June 19, 1641, he was selected by the King of Spain and confirmed on January 13, 1642, by Pope Urban VIII as Archbishop of Santo Domingo. He was consecrated bishop by Juan de Palafox y Mendoza, Bishop of Tlaxcala with Father Nicolás de la Torre Muñoz assisting. He served as Bishop of Santo Domingo until his death in April 1642.

References

External links and additional sources
 (for Chronology of Bishops) 
 (for Chronology of Bishops) 

1612 births
1642 deaths
Bishops appointed by Pope Urban VIII
Roman Catholic archbishops of Santo Domingo
17th-century Roman Catholic archbishops in the Dominican Republic